Trammer See is a lake in Kreis Plön, Schleswig-Holstein, Germany. At an elevation of 20.03 m, its surface area is 1.63 km².

External links 
 

Lakes of Schleswig-Holstein